Two ships in the United States Navy have been named USS Stringham for Silas Horton Stringham.

 The first  was a torpedo boat launched in 1899 and sold in 1923

United States Navy ship names